The Pakistan national cricket team toured South Africa during the 1997–98 season, playing three Tests from 14 February to 10 March 1998.

Pakistan was led by Rashid Latif while South Africa was led by Hansie Cronje. The tour began with a Test series consisting of three matches. Both captains had to withdraw from part of the Test series with injury.

The series was drawn 1–1. At the end of the series, Azhar Mahmood of Pakistan emerged as the top run-scorer with 327 runs, with an average of 65.40; Saeed Anwar followed close behind with 236 runs. Waqar Younis and Allan Donald finished the series as top wicket-takers capturing 16 wickets respectively, with Mushtaq Ahmed taking 13. Azhar Mahmood was named "man of the series".

The Pakistan tour was followed by a tour of Zimbabwe, followed by a triangular One-Day tournament played in South Africa, which included Sri Lanka as the third team. Pakistan qualified from the group stage. Pakistan were defeated in the Final by South Africa.

Squad 

Fazl-e-Akbar, Mohammad Hussain, Shahid Afridi and Wasim Akram later reinforced the party.

Tour matches

Nicky Oppenheimer XI v Pakistanis

This match did not have List A status.

Four-day: Griqualand West v Pakistanis

Four-day: Border v Pakistanis

Three-day: Free State v Pakistanis

Test matches

1st Test

2nd Test

3rd Test

See also
1997–98 Standard Bank International One-Day Series

References

External links
 Tour home at ESPNcricinfo
 Pakistan in South Africa, Jan-Mar 1998 at ESPNcricinfo archive
 
 

1998 in South African cricket
South African cricket seasons from 1970–71 to 1999–2000
1997-98
International cricket competitions from 1997–98 to 2000
1998 in Pakistani cricket